Raymond Arthur Faulkner (born 26 May 1934) is an English former professional footballer who played as a winger.

References

1934 births
People from Horncastle, Lincolnshire
English footballers
Association football wingers
Horncastle Town F.C. players
Grimsby Town F.C. players
Louth United F.C. players
English Football League players
Living people